Boreus nivoriundus, known generally as the snow-born boreus or snow scorpionfly, is a species of snow scorpionfly in the family Boreidae. It is found in North America.

References

Boreus
Articles created by Qbugbot
Insects described in 1847
Insects of North America